The FIBA Asia Champions Cup 2012 was the 23rd staging of the FIBA Asia Champions Cup, the international basketball club tournament of FIBA Asia. The tournament was held in Beirut, Lebanon in October 15–22, 2012.

Qualification
According to the FIBA Asia rules, each zone had one place, and the hosts was automatically qualified. The other three places are allocated to the zones according to performance in the 2011 FIBA Asia Champions Cup.

* Withdrew

Preliminary round

Final round

Semifinals

3rd place

Final

 No title awarded, but FIBA Asia website later announced both teams tied on 1st and 2nd places.

Final standing

References

External links 
 
 

2012
FIBA Asia Champions Cup
Champions Cup
International basketball competitions hosted by Lebanon